How to Be a Man is a 2013 American comedy film directed by Chadd Harbold and starring Gavin McInnes. It tells the story of an ex-comedian who mistakenly believes that he is dying from male breast cancer, and therefore makes a video with advice for his unborn son. The film was produced through Zero Day Fox.

Cast
 Gavin McInnes as Mark McCarthy
 Liam Aiken as Bryan
 Megan Neuringer as Margot
 Nicole Balsam as Gabby
 Marisa Redanty as Bryan's mom
 Helen Rogers as Kaitlin
 Jasmine Osborne as Annabelle

Release
The film premiered on August 10, 2013 at the Sundance Next Weekend in Los Angeles. It was released on the Internet on March 15, 2014.

Reception
The Hollywood Reporter's Justin Lowe wrote: "Serving as a reminder that gross-out male-centric comedies aren't just the domain of better-pedigreed productions, How To Be A Man strips the genre down to its bare essentials, which primarily has the effect of emphasizing the careful tonal calibration required to effectively pull off a such a relentless raunch-fest. ... With his extensive media background, Vice Magazine co-founder, comedian and ad-man McInnes would seem to be a savvy commentator on contemporary male foibles, but Man's litany of life lessons turns out to have variable appeal when reduced to their lowest common denominators of sex, partying and bodily functions."

External links
 https://www.imdb.com/title/tt2479384/

References

2013 comedy films
2013 films
American comedy films
20th Digital Studio films
2010s English-language films
2010s American films